Franz Josef Gottlieb (1 November 1930 – 23 July 2006) was an Austrian film director and screenwriter. He directed 60 films between 1959 and 2005. He also directed the children's series Ravioli in 1983; it aired on ZDF in 1984. He was born in Semmering, Austria and died in Verden an der Aller, Germany of a brain tumor, at age 75.

Selected filmography

 Mikosch of the Secret Service (co-director Franz Marischka, 1959)
 My Niece Doesn't Do That (1960)
 Season in Salzburg (1961)
 The Forester's Daughter (1962)
 The Curse of the Yellow Snake (1963)
 The Black Abbot (1963)
 The Secret of the Black Widow (1963)
 The Seventh Victim (1964)
 The Curse of the Hidden Vault (1964)
 The Phantom of Soho (1964)
  (1965)
  (1965)
 A Holiday with Piroschka (1965)
 Spy Today, Die Tomorrow (1967)
 When You're With Me (1970)
 When the Mad Aunts Arrive (1970)
 Aunt Trude from Buxtehude (1971)
 The Mad Aunts Strike Out (1971)
 Rudi, Behave! (1971)
 Trouble with Trixie (1972)
 Crazy - Completely Mad (1973) 
 No Sin on the Alpine Pastures (1974)
 The Secret Carrier (1975)
 Lady Dracula (1977)
 Popcorn and Ice Cream (1978)
 She's 19 and Ready (1979)
 Mandara (1983, TV miniseries) 
 Death Stone (1987)
  (1987)
 Kartoffeln mit Stippe (1990, TV miniseries)
 Die Liebe eines Priesters (2005, TV film)

References

External links

1930 births
2006 deaths
Austrian film directors
Austrian television directors
Austrian male screenwriters
People from Neunkirchen District, Austria
Deaths from cancer in Germany
Neurological disease deaths in Germany
Deaths from brain tumor
20th-century Austrian screenwriters
20th-century Austrian male writers